Stories for Chip: A Tribute to Samuel R. Delany (2015) is a collection of 33 pieces of short fiction, essays, and creative non-fiction by a myriad group of global writers in honor of author Samuel R. "Chip" Delany, coinciding with his retirement from his career of university teaching.

Development and inspiration 
The collection is compiled and edited by SF and fantastic fiction writer Nisi Shawl, and published by author and Rosarium Publishing founder, Bill Campbell. Publication was the result of crowdfunding and donations coordinated at Wiscon's (SF)³ website and Indiegogo .

Content 
The book includes:
"Introduction (Stories for Chip)", essay by Stanley Robinson
"Michael Swanwick and Samuel R. Delany at the Joyce Kilmer Service Area" (2007) a short story by Eileen Gunn
"Billy Tumult", short story by Nick Harkaway
"Voice Prints", short story by Devorah Major 
"Delany Encounters: or, Another Reason Why I Study Race and Racism in Science Fiction", essay by Isiah Lavender, III of Extrapolation" (journal)
"Clarity", short story by Anil Menon 
"When Two Swordsmen Meet", short story by Ellen Kushner
"For Sale: Fantasy Coffins (Ababuo Need Not Apply)", short story by Chesya Burke
"Holding Hands with Monsters", short story byHaralambi Markov
"Song for the Asking", short story by Carmelo Rafala 
"Kickenders", short story by Kit Reed
"Walking Science Fiction: Samuel Delany and Visionary Fiction", essay by Walidah Imarisha
"Heart of Brass", short fiction by poet Alex Jennings
"Empathy Evolving As a Quantum of Eight-Dimensional Perception", 2013 short story by Claude Lalumière 
"Be Three", short story by Jewelle Gomez
"Guerrilla Mural of a Siren's Song", 1989 short story by Ernest Hogan
"An Idyll in Erewhyna", short story by Hal Duncan
"Real Mothers, a Faggot Uncle, and the Name of the Father: Samuel R. Delany's Feminist Revisions of the Story of SF", essay by L. Timmel Duchamp 
"Nilda ", short story by Junot Díaz
"The First Gate of Logic", short story by Benjamin Rosenbaum
"The Master of the Milford Altarpiece", 1968 short story by Thomas M. Disch
"River, Clap Your Hands ", short story by Sheree Renée Thomas
"Haunt-Type Experience", 2009 short story by Roz Clarke
"Eleven Stations", short story by Fábio Fernandes
"Légendaire", 2013 novelette by Kai Ashante Wilson
"On My First Reading of The Einstein Intersection", essay by Michael Swanwick
"Characters in the Margins of a Lost Notebook", short story by Kathryn Cramer
"Hamlet's Ghost Sighted in Frontenac, KS", short story by Vincent Czyz
"Each Star a Sun to Invisible Plane", short story by Tenea D. Johnson
"Clones", short story by Alex Smith (II)
"The Last Dying Man", short story by Geetanjali Dighe
"Capitalism in the 22nd Century or A.I.r.", short story by Geoff Ryman
"Jamaica Ginger", novelette by Nalo Hopkinson and Nisi Shawl
"Festival", novelette by Chris Nakashima-Brown as by Christopher Brown (I)

Themes

Reception

See also
Nisi Shawl
Samuel R. Delany
Dark Matter anthology
Geoff Ryman
Nalo Hopkinson
Anil Menon
Kathryn Cramer
Vincent Czyz
Festschrift
List of festschrifts

References 

2015 anthologies
American anthologies
Science fiction anthologies
Fantasy anthologies
2010s science fiction works
Women science fiction and fantasy writers
Gender in speculative fiction
Cyberpunk
Cyberpunk writers
Science fiction culture
Science fiction organizations
Academic science fiction awards
American literary awards
Black speculative fiction authors
Lists of speculative fiction-related award winners and nominees